Jeunesse Sportive Djijelienne, known as JS Djijel or simply JSD for short, is an Algerian football club based in Jijel. The club was founded in 1936 and its colours are green and white. Their home stadium, Rouibah Hocine Stadium, has a capacity of 50,000 spectators. The club is currently playing in the Ligue Nationale du Football Amateur.

JS Djijel is the leading football club in the city of Jijel. It is also one of the first football clubs created in the city in 1936. The club's glory days were in the 1970s with good players such as Carlos Lehtihet, Boubezari, Aberkane, etc.

References

External links
Official website

Football clubs in Algeria
Jijel Province
Association football clubs established in 1936
1936 establishments in Algeria
Sports clubs in Algeria